Pseudowintera is a genus of woody evergreen flowering trees and shrubs, part of family Winteraceae. The species of Pseudowintera are native to New Zealand. Winteraceae are magnoliids, associated with the humid Antarctic flora of the southern hemisphere. Horopito can be chewed for a hot, peppery taste.

Pseudowintera axillaris, is known as the lowland horopito. It is a shrub or small tree growing up to eight metres tall in lowland and lower montane forests from 35° to 42° South. In the South Island it grows West of the Main Divide.
Pseudowintera colorata, or mountain horopito, is an evergreen shrub or small tree (1–2.5 m) commonly called pepperwood because its leaves have a very hot bite. Its yellow and green leaves are blotched with red; new leaves in the spring are bright red. It is widespread throughout New Zealand, from lowland forests to higher montane forests, and from 36° 30' South as far southwards as Stewart Island/Rakiura. Because of its various uses, both medicinal and culinary, the name horopito when used in common speech normally refers to the colorata species.
Pseudowintera traversii, or Travers horopito, is a compact shrub up to one metre tall. It grows naturally only in the northwest corner of the South Island, from Collingwood to Westport.

Cultivation
Horopito spreads naturally through regrowth on cleared land but may often be found in domestic gardens as a decorative plant. Planting for commercial purposes has begun in recent years.

Pharmaceutical use
Horopito contains a substance called sesquiterpene dialdehyde polygodiali, otherwise known as polygodial that has a number of biological properties including antifungal, antimicrobial, anti-inflammatory, antiallergic and insecticide effects. Polygodial has been tested as a very effective inhibitor of Candida albicans. Horopito was used traditionally by Maori for a variety of medicinal purposes including treatment of: fungal skin infection, stomach pain, diarrhoea and as an analgesic. Early European settlers to New Zealand also used horopito for medicinal purposes.

Culinary use
Horopito leaves are used in cooking in a variety of ways. Horopito is now being used as a seasoning in modern New Zealand cuisine. Typically the leaves are dried and then ground to form a powder. The powder may be used wherever black pepper is used and applied directly to meats, mixed with oils, used to make condiments (e.g. with mustard), in vinegars, biscuits and even ice-cream.

References

Winteraceae
Canellales genera
Trees of New Zealand
Māori cuisine
Endemic flora of New Zealand